Holunchekan (also Romanized as Holūnchekān; also known as ’alūb Chekān, Helān Chekān, Holān Chokān, and Holonchekān) is a village in Holunchekan Rural District in the Central District of Qasr-e Qand County, Sistan and Baluchestan Province, Iran. At the 2006 census, its population was 1,017, in 178 families.

References 

Populated places in Qasr-e Qand County